Wu Wenying (1932 – 26 April 2007) was a Chinese politician who served as  from 1983 to 1993.

She was a member of the 12th, 13th and 14th Central Committee of the Chinese Communist Party. She was a member of the Standing Committee of the 9th Chinese People's Political Consultative Conference.

Biography
Wu was born in Changzhou, Jiangsu, in 1932. 

She joined the Chinese Communist Party (CCP) in September 1949. After graduating from East China Institute of Textile Technology (now Donghua University) in 1963, she became an official in Changzhou municipal government. In June 1983, she was promoted to become , a position she held until March 1993. She retired in May 2001.

On 26 April 2007, she died from an illness in Beijing, at the age of 75.

Investigation
In 2000, Wu was placed on two-year probation within the Party for serious violations of discipline.

References

1932 births
2007 deaths
People from Changzhou
Donghua University alumni
People's Republic of China politicians from Jiangsu
Chinese Communist Party politicians from Jiangsu
Members of the 12th Central Committee of the Chinese Communist Party
Members of the 13th Central Committee of the Chinese Communist Party
Members of the 14th Central Committee of the Chinese Communist Party
Members of the Standing Committee of the 9th Chinese People's Political Consultative Conference